Gaspare Sommaripa (died 1402) was a Lord of Paros by right of his wife.

Marriage and issue
He married in 1390 Maria Sanudo, lady of Paros (died 1426), and had Crusino I Sommaripa, Lord of Paros, and Fiorenza Sommaripa, wife of Giacomo I Crispo, eleventh Duke of the Archipelago.

References

 Ancestry of Sultana Nur-Banu (Cecilia Venier-Baffo)
 

1402 deaths
Gaspare
Gaspare
People from the Cyclades
Year of birth unknown
14th-century Italian nobility
15th-century Italian nobility